Samuel Goss (born January 28, 1947) is an American boxer. He competed in the men's bantamweight event at the 1968 Summer Olympics.

In 2018, Goss received a payout of $25,000 from the city of Trenton to settle a lawsuit related to his injuries that resulted when the car in which he was a passenger was struck in a chain-reaction collision that was caused by a high-speed police chase.

References

1947 births
Living people
Bantamweight boxers
American male boxers
Olympic boxers of the United States
Boxers at the 1968 Summer Olympics
Sportspeople from Trenton, New Jersey
Boxers from New Jersey